Ravin v. State, 537 P.2d 494 (Ak. 1975), was a unanimous decision by the Alaska Supreme Court. Decided on May 27, 1975, the Court held that the Alaska Constitution's right to privacy protects an adult's ability to use and possess a small amount of marijuana in the home for personal use. The Alaska Supreme Court thereby became the first—and only—state or federal court to announce a constitutional privacy right that protects some level of marijuana use and possession.

History
It was brought about by Irwin Ravin, an attorney who deliberately got arrested in Anchorage for refusing to sign a traffic ticket while in possession of marijuana in order to challenge the existing law. Ravin felt that the case was more about privacy, saying

<blockquote>Marijuana has never been an issue for me. The fight was always for privacy, our territory and now state has traditionally been the home of people who prize their individuality and who have chosen to achieve a measure of control over their own lifestyles which is now virtually unattainable in many of our sister states.<ref>{{cite web|url=http://www.homernews.com/stories/041410/news_1_003.shtml |title=Friends, family pay tribute to man who fought for individual's right to privacy Michael Armstrong, Homer News, 4-14-10 |publisher=Homernews.com |access-date=2011-04-20}}</ref></blockquote>

The court ruled:

Subsequent law
Alaskan voters approved a ballot initiative recriminalizing marijuana possession in 1990, but in Noy v. State'', the Alaska Court of Appeals held that ballot initiatives are subject to the same constitutional limitations as legislative enactments, and thus the portion of the amended statutes criminalizing possession of less than four ounces of marijuana in the home was unconstitutional.  In June 2006, the Alaska Legislature amended the law to prohibit the possession of more than one ounce of marijuana and to make possession of more than one ounce of marijuana a class A misdemeanor. In July 2006, Juneau Superior Court Judge Patricia Collins struck down the law, ruling it unconstitutional. In April 2009, in a 3-2 ruling, the Supreme Court of Alaska vacated the lower court's ruling, finding that the plaintiffs lacked standing to sue in the first place.

In November 2014, Alaskan voters approved a ballot measure to legalize the possession and sale of marijuana, regulating it in a manner similar to alcohol sales.

Notes

References

External links
 

1975 in Alaska
1975 in United States case law
1975 in cannabis
Alaska state case law
Legal history of Alaska
United States controlled substances case law
Cannabis law in Alaska